Ellen Williams may refer to:

Ellen Dinalo Williams, actress
Ellen D. Williams (scientist) (born 1953), American scientist
Ellen Williams (luger) (born 1947), American luger
Ellen Williams, last speaker of the Whulshootseed dialect

See also
Helen Williams (disambiguation)